Indian Matchmaking is a 2020 Indian reality television series produced by Smriti Mundhra that premiered on Netflix on July 16, 2020. In August 2021, Netflix renewed the series for a second season. In March 2022, Netflix renewed the series for a third season.

Cast

Main cast 
Sima Taparia, a marriage consultant from Mumbai who uses preferences from the people, their parents, and her years of matchmaking experience. She previously appeared on Mundhra's A Suitable Girl.
Aparna Shewakramani, a 34-year old attorney and general counsel from Houston.
Pradhyuman Maloo (sometimes referred as Pradhyumn), a 30-year old jeweler born and raised in Mumbai.
Nadia Christina Jagessar, a 33-year old event planner from New Jersey who runs her own company, Euphoria Events, and works as a marketer for Givaudan.
Vyasar Ganesan, a 30-year old teacher, college counsellor, and writer from Austin.
Akshay Jakhete, a 36-year old businessman, who is a self-described introvert from Mumbai.
Ankita Bansal, a 30-year old businesswoman in India who has her own business in garment e-commerce.
Rupam Kaur, a divorced single mother who according to Taparia had very slim chances of getting remarried, but eventually find love through Bumble.

Supporting cast 

 Shekar Jayaraman, a 34-year old Chicago attorney and entrepreneur.
Jay Wadhwani, a 35-year old entrepreneur and product manager from Atlanta.
 Rashi Gupta, a 27-year old small & exotic animal veterinarian from Los Angeles.

Release 
Indian Matchmaking was released on July 16, 2020, on Netflix.

Episodes

Season 1 (2020)

Season 2 (2022)

Production

Development 
Series director Smriti Mundhra pitched the idea of the show to a TV producer in 2009/2010, but the show was rejected for "essentially not being white enough." She pitched the show to Netflix by showing Taparia, who "were super excited about it." She had met Taparia three years before Indian Matchmaking premiered on Netflix, when she documented the lives of other three women going through the Indian marriage process in the 2017 documentary, A Suitable Girl. Taparia's daughter was one of the young women featured.

Casting 
Mundhra named the casting the biggest hurdle of the show, going through a client list of 500 families and calling to see if they were willing to be on camera. Mundhra also noted that the series initially started with about a dozen singles but some of those "fell off" during production.

Critical reception 
The show received mixed reviews between critics and social media users. Inkoo Kang of The Hollywood Reporter called the show "insightful, humorous and heartwarming," praising how it showcases the preoccupation with height and caste, as well as Taparia's matchmaking tactics. Kristen Baldwin of Entertainment Weekly gave the show a B+, stating that the show as presented in a "glossy, cosmopolitan drama, without a hint of 'look at these crazy foreigners and their kooky customs!' condescension." Joel Keller of Decider called people to stream it, saying that it "brings thousands of years of tradition into the mix, and there’s a much better chance that the matches that are made at the end of the season will last." Archi Sengupta of Techquila rated the show 4 stars out of 5, calling it "sweet and entertaining."

Reinforcing religion and caste segregation
Though the show is called Indian Matchmaking, it portrays no couples who identify as Muslim, Christian, or Dalit— communities that represent close to 40 percent of India's population. The show has also been criticised for normalizing caste based discrimination such as when matchmaker Taparia declares "In India, we have to see the caste, we have to see the height..." which Yashica Dutt of The Atlantic describes as "lump[ing] an entire social system, which assigns people to a fixed place in a hierarchy from birth, together with anodyne physical preferences." Per Dutt, in the show, caste preference is coded into harmless phrases such as “similar backgrounds,” “shared communities,” and “respectable families,” and "the show does exactly what many upper-caste Indian families tend to do when discussing this fraught subject: It makes caste invisible." The show was also said to further endorse and promote gender stereotypes.

In addition to showing "classist" and "casteist" stereotypes, the show was criticised for whitewashing the idea of arranged marriages. Kennith Rosario of The Hindu labeled the show as "The big fat desi stereotype," saying that the characters "believe in some of the most atavistic ideals of marriage, and the show, in its glossy demeanour, endorses it." Sushri Sahu of Mashable gave the show a 2/5 on the Mash Meter, criticizing how the show is "problematic and cheesy in equal parts." In response to the criticisms, Smriti Mundhra stated that she hoped that "it will spark a lot of conversations that all of us need to be having in the South Asian community with our families – that it’ll be a jumping-off point for reflections about the things that we prioritize, and the things that we internalize.” Ravi Guru Singh, a cast member who wrote a personal piece for the Huffington Post about his appearance on episode 2 of the show, criticized the producers for misrepresenting his appearance and failing to "discuss and explore casteism, homophobia and ethnocentrism."

The Los Angeles Times followed up with the couples appearing on the show and reported that they are not together anymore.

See also 
 A Suitable Girl

References

External links
 
 

English-language Netflix original programming
Hindi-language Netflix original programming
2020 Indian television series debuts
Dating and relationship reality television series
Indian reality television series